A penumbral lunar eclipse took place on Wednesday, January 9, 1963, the first of three lunar eclipses in 1963.

This was a relatively rare total penumbral lunar eclipse with the moon passing entirely within the penumbral shadow without entering the darker umbral shadow.

Visibility

Related lunar eclipses

Lunar year series

Saros series
Lunar Saros series 114, repeating every 18 years and 11 days, has a total of 71 lunar eclipse events including 13 total lunar eclipses.

First Penumbral Lunar Eclipse: 0971 May 13

First Partial Lunar Eclipse: 1115 Aug 07

First Total Lunar Eclipse: 1458 Feb 28

First Central Lunar Eclipse: 1530 Apr 12

Greatest Eclipse of Lunar Saros 114: 1584 May 24

Last Central Lunar Eclipse: 1638 Jun 26

Last Total Lunar Eclipse: 1674 Jul 17

Last Partial Lunar Eclipse: 1890 Nov 26

Last Penumbral Lunar Eclipse: 2233 Jun 22

See also
List of lunar eclipses
List of 20th-century lunar eclipses

Notes

External links

1963-01
1963-01
1963 in science
January 1963 events